Jai Karoli Maa is an Indian movie directed by Ram Pahwa which was released in 1988. The movie is based on the religious theme based on Karoli Maa of Hindu religion.

Cast

Soundtrack 
Lyrics and music by Ravindra Jain. Songs sung by Mahendra Kapoor, Suresh Wadkar, Hemlata and Anuradha Paudwal.

References

1980s Hindi-language films
1988 films
T-Series (company) films